Whanganui Māori are the Māori iwi (tribes) and hapū (sub-tribes) of the Whanganui River area of New Zealand. They are also known as Ngāti Hau.

One group of Whanganui Māori, Whanganui Iwi, includes Te Āti Haunui-a-Pāpārangi and other  who signed the Ruruku Whakatupua Treaty of Waitangi settlement in 2015.

Awa FM is the radio station of Te Āti Haunui-a-Pāpārangi, Ngāti Hāua and Ngāti Hauiti. It began as Te Reo Irirangi O Whanganui 100FM on 17 June 1991. Between July 1992 and June 1993 it also operated a separate station in Ohakune, known as Te Reo Irirangi Ki Ruapehu or Nga Iwi FM, combining local programmes with shows from 100FM.

Notable people
 

Kawana Pitiroi Paipai

See also
List of Māori iwi

References